The St. Louis Metro Collegiate Baseball League, also known as the Metro League, is a collegiate summer baseball league in Greater St. Louis. The league was founded in 1979 by college and high school baseball coaches and by professional scouts. The league is a member of the National Amateur Baseball Federation (NABF) with the winner of the league playoffs qualifying for NABF post-season play in August.The Metro League has won three NABF National Championships in 2003, 2013 and 2015.

Notable alumni
Hundreds of St.Louis Metro Collegiate alumni have gone on to play professional baseball, with 20 of them making it all the way to Major League Baseball.  The Major Leaguers include:
David Freese
Justin Hampson
Scott Bailes
Brian Boehringer
Joe Boever
Mark Buehrle
Scarborough Green
Mike Henneman
Lonnie Maclin
T.J. Mathews
Bill Mueller
Al Nipper
Bryan Oelkers
Robert Person
Cliff Politte
Kerry Robinson
Dave Silvestri
Donne Wall

References

External links
Official site

Summer baseball leagues
Sports in St. Louis
Baseball leagues in Missouri
Baseball leagues in Illinois
College baseball leagues in the United States
Sports leagues established in 1979